Te'o is a Samoan surname. Notable people surnamed Te'o include:

 Ben Te'o, New Zealand-born Rugby Union player representing England.
 Daniel Te'o-Nesheim, American football defensive end.
 Feleti Teo, Tuvaluan former Secretary General of the Pacific Islands Forum.
 Manti Te'o, American football linebacker.
 Vaiee, a Samoan village with Te'o as a chiefly title.

See also
 Teo (disambiguation)